The Several Journeys of Reemus is a point-and-click adventure game series by game developer Jay "Zeebarf" Ziebarth, published by Newgrounds starting in 2008. Like Zeebarf's other point-and-click games, The Several Journeys of Reemus involves the use of logic and the cause-and-effect of selected actions. The game series currently has six games finished and published, including a prologue.

Gameplay
TBA

Reception
The series has received several annual award nominations, including JayIsGames' Best of 2008 Adventure Game of the Year for Prologue, Newgrounds' Best of 2008 Tank Award Game of the Year for Chapter 2, Flash Gaming Summit Mochi Award 2009 Best Game Art for Chapter 2 and JayIsGames' Best of 2009 Point and click Game of the Year for Chapter 3. JayIsGames' average rating of the four games is 4.6/5.

During a Casual Connect Seattle 2009 panel, Kongregate CEO Jim Greer mentioned Chapter 3 saying it was "a successful game on Kongregate, but most of the negative comments focused on its unnecessary length", illustrating the point that length doesn't equal value. Channel4's review of Chapter 2 says, "It looks brilliant as always, and has a wicked sense of humour running through."  Justin McElroy of Joystiq said the prologue's puzzles "strike just the right balance of logical and abstract thinking" and called the music "fantastic".

Story
The Several Journeys of Reemus is staged in a fictional world and kingdom called Fredericus. The two main characters are Reemus, an exterminator, and his assistant, Liam the purple bear. Reemus is inclined to be complacent and narcissistic while Liam is agreeable and kind. Reemus is seeking to outdo his brother, a dragon slayer, in fame and when 97% of the population is illiterate, the only way to get yourself known is through songs of heroic quests.

Prologue
This prologue is entitled "Lair of the Ant Queen". The game begins with Reemus and Liam walking toward an inn while composing a ballad chronicling Reemus' work as an exterminator. The innkeeper rushes out and asks the duo to rid his inn of an ant infestation. At first, Reemus is reluctant to do so, as it would "affect the quality and bravado" of his ballad. Then, the innkeeper shows him that the ants in question are as big as humans and their anthill the size of a volcano.

The prologue consists of random puzzles that lead Reemus and Liam to the Ant Queen, which Reemus must defeat. He does so, and is regarded as a legendary figure. The duo then receives a letter from the king of Fredericus inviting them to his castle.

This ending is caused by poisoning the queen. An alternate ending is for Reemus himself to jump into the Ant Queen's mouth, and she chokes on his head. He is regarded as a reckless exterminator and triggers a holy ant war between them and the humans, with no letter from the king.

Chapter One
The game begins with Reemus and Liam resting near a fire in the night. Reemus protests against Liam's doubts that the king summoned them to the castle to give Reemus his daughter's hand in marriage. Then a wolf-like creature chases them through the woods. Eventually they shake the creature off and arrive at the castle.

The castle is apparently deserted. Liam finds his way in and lets Reemus in on the other side of the door, but the creature finds them again, and they are forced to take shelter inside a dark room. In it is a strange pulsating purple object. In a trapdoor in the ceiling, they find a wizard who is retrieving his 'magical food recipes' and tells them to climb through the trapdoor into the room above. In the relative safety of the room, they watch the purple object slowly drop small red slugs onto the floor. The wizard tells them they are a new species called 'Death Slug', and are what caused the castle's other inhabitants to flee, as the species is overrunning the land. Then the slugs crawl outside and almost immediately kill the wolf-like creature. The wizard explains that Reemus was summoned to rid the castle of the Death Slugs. The wizard then flees from the castle on a cake lighter than air, leaving Reemus and Liam to brainstorm a way to escape. They manage to do so by using the wizard's potions.

This game has two possible endings:
1. They catch a bird and use a potion to make it gigantic. They fly away on the bird, but the spell runs out, and they both fall off.
2. They catch a rat and use some potions to make it a giant flying rat. They fly away, but a giant flying cat pounces the rat, not harming the duo, but taking away their ride.

Chapter Two
This chapter is entitled "The All-Knowing Parasite". Reemus and Liam tumble through the sky and land in a bale of hay in a barn. Reemus realizes the barn is close to their hometown, but suddenly the pig in the pigsty next to them implodes, and the duo hide in the hay. A Death Slug comes out of the pigsty with a pigsnout, and the duo realizes the Death Slugs absorb the characteristics of the organisms they ingest. They manage to lure and kill the Slug, which turns itself inside out upon dying, looking similar to the Slug egg sac they found in Chapter 1.

Then, Reemus wants to get his extermination equipment from town, but a smoke plume of considerable size is rising from town. Then a dart filled with yellow fluid hits Reemus in the neck, and he instantly faints. Liam recognises the fluid as Sugar Bee Honey, the sugar content of which is so high it causes temporary diabetic coma. He is immediately hit with another dart, and too faints.
Liam wakes up, and finds they are being held captive by a Gygax, many-mouthed creatures who have not been seen in Fredericus for a long time. He manages to wake up Reemus and knock out the Gygax with a Sugar Bee Honey dart. Their next line of action is to consult the All-Knowing Parasite and find out what is going on. But first they have to knock the Devouring Worm it is attached to with some Sugar Bee Honey.
They manage to obtain the honey by disguising Liam as a bee and arrive at the cave of the Devouring Worm. However, their enraged captive Gygax spots them and has made an alliance with the Death Slugs. Liam crawls into the cave with the honey, while Reemus stays outside to keep watch.

There are three possible endings here, two of which lead to a proper ending. The endings have rankings for Reemus and Liam based on what actions both of them take. The (Reemus) HERO and (Liam) HERO ranking ending is (presumably) the best, where Reemus successfully kills the Gygax while Liam feeds the honey to the Worm, knocking it out. He then asks the Parasite (which is attached to its tail) for advice. The Parasite's eyelid opens, and its eye starts to glow. Liam's face contorts in horror...

There are two alternate endings. Both of them start with Reemus hiding instead of killing the Gygax, earning the ranking COWARD. Then Liam is attacked by the Gygax, and either he can exit the cave without solving anything, or get lucky and have the Devouring Worm eat the Gygax and fall unconscious (some of the honey splattered on it), and it ends with Liam confronting the Parasite.

Chapter Three
This chapter is entitled "Know Thy Enemy". The game starts off not with Reemus or Liam, but a Death Slug from a meteor that crashed near Fredericus. The player controls the Death Slug as it ingests different creatures, and finally a Gygax. The Death Slug, now at enormous size, is red and hideous. Another Gygax comes along, and identifies the Death Slug as The Visitor from the Sky, who will lead them in battle against the human tyrants.
The Parasite ends the projection to Liam from its eye, everything up to that point being what Liam was seeing from it, after which it closes its eye. Liam is worried by what he has just learned, but after exiting the cave and telling Reemus the situation, Reemus sees it all as a "perfect opportunity" to "finally legitimize extermination as a heroic career choice". First the two will have to go to talk to the king of Danricus, a nearby kingdom, so they can make sure they can complete their adventure without anyone stealing their credit. They encounter a politician cockroach on the way who is being held captive by a creature who eats cockroaches. The roach is suspended next to a cliff.

Here, there are two separate paths to take. The Path of Least Resistance, where Liam frees the roach, who leads them out of the forest, or the Path of Aggression, where Reemus fells a tree onto the roach, killing him but paving a path across the cliff with the tree.

Path of Least Resistance:

Eventually, the duo reaches a riverside, where the Castle of Danricus is just across the river. However, only Royal deliveries are allowed across the river, and the boatman isn't very generous. Liam fools the boatman by having a strip of paper bark pass off as a royal letter. Halfway through the boat ride, they encounter a deserted ship just cleared for delivery. The boatman enters the ship, leaving Reemus and Liam on the small boat. He appears to be killed by a Death Slug on the boat, and the duo, upon seeing this, flee with the small boat.

Path of Aggression:

The duo discover a meeting place at the riverside for the Death Slugs and Gygaxes. Apparently, The Visitor is breeding an army of Death Slugs. The Gygaxes help by fetching the organisms the Death Slugs need to consume to gain sentience. The duo sneak past the crowd and make for a small boat at the riverside.

The two paths open different puzzles for the player to solve. In this chapter, nearly every scene can toggle the characters to perform actions.

Chapter Four
The duo wash ashore in Danicus where Reemus and Liam find themselves faced with the one last, but also most damning, obstacle to their quest for fame: Bureaucracy. In order to have the Kingdom recognize them for defeating the Death Slug invasion, the duo must get their quest recognized by the Department of Heroic Requests. Their issue is that the Guild operates in a way to be as obstructive as possible to keep everyone from running off on heroic quests and leaving behind no one to get any work done. To get their quest legitimized as quickly as the Guild will let them, they must complete a complex application and have it approved.

Firstly, they need to obtain three references from clients to be recognized as adventurers and luckily there are three active quests, all insect extermination requests, on the notice board they can use. A potion stand owner's customers are being scared away by his neighbor's disgusting body lice, which require a complex series of potions in order to clean up. A woman's garden, needed for royal banquet flowers, is threatened by attack from giant hornets, forcing Liam and Reemus to track down their nest and smoke them out. A giant beetle is occupying a bridge leading into town trapping an icicle pop vendor on the other side with all of his merchandise, and Reemus and Liam end up removing the beetle by collapsing the bridge under him, and have the vendor use spare icicle pop sticks as a temporary bridge.

Secondly, the pair needs to obtain proof the threat they speak of is legitimate, thus they go back to the shore. There, after finding one of the evolved death slugs, Reemus puts together a trap to crush the slug to death while Liam rustles a sheep to use as bait, and together they succeed in killing the slug and obtaining their sample. Now having a legitimate request from the receptionist instructs them to put it on line, as in on an actual clothes line leading up to a tall, far off tower. However, the pair find said line has been so stuffed full of requests, they realize they will never be able to put their request through before a ship commandeered by death slugs arrives.

Reemus proposes for Liam to walk the tightrope to bypass the line, except Liam does not know how, but a second look at the notice board reveals a nearby circus is offering lessons for acrobats. When they get there, they discover their would-be instructor has been kidnapped by actual couch potatoes in order to entertain them: Liam and Reemus are forced to dress up as clowns to get into the Potatoes lair, sabotage their makeshift TV to bore them to sleep, and finally rescue the acrobat, so they can get Liam his lesson.

Thus returning to the department, Liam successfully tightropes his way across to the registration office with the request, to which the office begins the process to have the quest to stop the Death slugs legitimized at last. Recognizing the death slug ship will still arrive before the quest is fully legitimized, Reemus and Liam goes back to their various quest locales in order to gather the materials needed to launch one of three counterattacks against the ship.

1. Might and Magic - Reemus uses a hair growth potion on the giant beetle to make it resemble a giant floating mass of sea weed before ordering it to go over and sink the ship unnoticed.

2. Might and Mind - Reemus yells insults at the Gygax causing one of them to expose himself and is subsequently harpooned by Reemus using one of the giant hornet stingers, in the subsequent chaos the beetle is able to swim over and sink the ship.

3. Mind and Magic - After using an alchemical plant growth formula on the nearby cannon bulbs, Reemus then stuffs the newly enlarged plant/makeshift cannon with giant hornet stingers and shoots the ship, sinking it in the process.

Though the ship is now stopped, Reemus and Liam know the death slugs will return. However, by then the paper work will have been pushed through, allowing them to finally stop the death slugs and save everyone, thus making them heroes, and so they go to the nearby bar to celebrate their success.

Future developments
Another Reemus game was announced, planned for a simultaneous release with the fourth game in 2011. Ballads of Reemus: When the Bed Bites is the first full-length and premium Reemus game with fully voice acted dialogue. The game was developed by ClickShake Games, a company co-founded by Zeebarf in 2010. It was released January 27, 2012.

References

External links
 Newgrounds' Reemus Collection

2008 video games
Adventure games
Fantasy video games
Flash games
Point-and-click adventure games
Single-player video games